Valeriu "Vivi" Răchită (born 30 May 1970) is a Romanian former footballer and current manager.

Playing career
A central defender, he spent most of his career in Romania with Steaua București and Petrolul Ploiești, winning a combined five domestic honours with them. Răchită also had brief stints in the country at FC Onești, Farul Constanța and  FC Universitatea Craiova, as well as at Ankaragücü and Litex Lovech abroad.

Managerial career
Răchită began coaching in 2005 at Petrolul Ploiești, and continued his early managerial career at Chimia Brazi and rivals from Astra Ploiești. He returned to Petrolul in 2009, and guided it to Liga I promotion at the end of the 2010–11 season after winning its series in the second division.

Between 2014 and 2015, Răchita served as an assistant to Victor Pițurcă at the Romania national team and Saudi Arabian club Al-Ittihad, respectively.

Career statistics

Managerial

Honours

Player
Petrolul Ploiești
Cupa României: 1994–95
President's Gold Cup in Dhaka, Bangladesh: 1993

Steaua București
Divizia A: 1996–97, 1997–98
Cupa României: 1996–97
Supercupa României: 1998

Litex Lovech
Bulgarian Cup: 2000–01

Manager
Petrolul Ploiești
Liga II: 2010–11

References

External links

1970 births
Living people
Romanian footballers
Romanian expatriate footballers
CSO Plopeni players
MKE Ankaragücü footballers
PFC Litex Lovech players
FC Petrolul Ploiești players
FCV Farul Constanța players
FC U Craiova 1948 players
FC Steaua București players
FC Astra Giurgiu managers
Liga I players
Süper Lig players
First Professional Football League (Bulgaria) players
Expatriate footballers in Turkey
Expatriate footballers in Bulgaria
Romanian football managers
FC Petrolul Ploiești managers
CS Sportul Snagov managers
ACS Poli Timișoara managers
Association football defenders